Mariano de María (born 31 August 1901, date of death unknown) was an Argentine bobsledder. He competed in the four-man event at the 1928 Winter Olympics.

References

1901 births
Year of death missing
Argentine male bobsledders
Olympic bobsledders of Argentina
Bobsledders at the 1928 Winter Olympics
Place of birth missing